Euphaedra aureola, the long-banded Themis forester, is a butterfly in the family Nymphalidae. It is found in Nigeria, Cameroon and the Republic of the Congo. The habitat consists of wetter forests.

Adults are attracted to fallen fruit.

The larvae feed on Octolobus species.

Subspecies
Euphaedra aureola aureola (Cameroon, Congo)
Euphaedra aureola nitens Hecq, 1997 (southern Nigeria)

Similar species
Other members of themis species group q.v.

References

Butterflies described in 1889
aureola
Butterflies of Africa
Taxa named by William Forsell Kirby